Georg Johann Luger (March 6, 1849 –  December 22, 1923) was an Austrian designer of the famous Luger pistol and the 9×19mm Parabellum cartridge.

Early life and military service
Georg Luger was born in Steinach am Brenner, Tyrol to Dr. Bartholomaeus von Luger, a surgeon. After Georg's birth, his family moved to Italy, where Dr. Luger taught at the University of Padua. Georg grew up with Italian as his second mother tongue and finished Grundschule (primary school) and Gymnasium (university-preparatory school) in Austrian Padua. After graduation, his parents sent him to Vienna, where he studied at the Wiener Handelsakademie (Vienna Commercial Academy), the predecessor to today's Vienna Business School.

He was promoted to Cadett-Corporal (Officer Cadet Corporal) on June 1, 1868, and to Faehnrich (Ensign) on October 1. Luger's good marksmanship brought him to the attention of his superiors; he was sent to the Austro-Hungarian Military Firearms School at Camp Bruckneudorf, where he soon became an instructor. There, his interest in automatic loading systems began. In 1871, Luger was promoted to Leutnant der Reserve (lieutenant) and moved to the military reserve.

Family
Luger married Elisabeth Josefa Dufek in 1873. He moved to Vienna with her and they had three children (in order):

Georg Franz Luger
Julius Wilhelm Bartholomaeus Luger (born March 16, 1880)
Friedrich Alexander Georg Luger (born April 26, 1884)

Luger's first son, Georg Franz, became a civil engineer and joined his father in military weapons development. His second son fell as a Hauptmann d.R. (Reservist Captain) in World War I on the Galician front in 1915.

After the military
After leaving the military, Luger worked as an accountant and later in the management of the Jockey Club, one of the top social meeting points in Vienna.

He met Ferdinand von Mannlicher in about 1875 and the two collaborated on rifle magazine designs, which seemed to awaken a latent talent for design within Luger.

In 1891, Luger was employed by Ludwig Loewe & Company (of Berlin, Germany) and gradually became a consultant designer.

In 1894, he was sent to demonstrate a Hugo Borchardt-designed weapon, manufactured by Deutsche Waffen und Munitions Fabriken (DWM) (which had evolved from Loewe after its founder's death), to the US Army. The Army rejected the pistol, but from criticism he received, Luger improved it, creating the Parabellum pistol (commonly called a Luger), and patenting it in 1898. This pistol was a success for both Luger and DWM.

Luger's contract with DWM was cancelled in 1919 and he successfully sued them over patent royalties. However, Luger had lost all his savings by this time.

He was decorated Order of Prince Danilo I.

Bibliography
  Imperial Lugers by Jan C. Still (Still's Books, 1994)
  Third Reich Lugers by Jan C. Still (Still's Books, 1988)
  Weimar Lugers by Jan C. Still (Still's Books, 1993)
  Lugers at Random by Charles Kenyon (Hand Gun Press, 1990)
  La Luger Artiglieria by Mauro Baudino (Editoriale Olimpia, 2004)
  The Complete Handgun by Ian V Hogg (Peerage Books, 1984)
  The Parabellum is Back! 1945 - 2000 by Mauro Baudino & Gerben van Vlimmeren (Simpson Ltd., 2010)

References

Sources
Luger Artillery and Mauser Parabellum - Original Luger handwritten letter to Paul Mauser
"NEW DATA ABOUT GEORG LUGER CONCERNING MAXIM MACHINE GUNS AND HIS PISTOL"

1849 births
1923 deaths
People from Innsbruck-Land District
Weapon designers
Firearm designers
Austro-Hungarian Army officers